Interfaith marriage, sometimes called a  "mixed marriage", is marriage between spouses professing different religions. Although interfaith marriages are often established as civil marriages, in some instances they may be established as a religious marriage. This depends on religious doctrine of each of the two parties' religions; some prohibit interfaith marriage, and among others there are varying degrees of permissibility.

Several major religions are mute on the issue, and still others allow it with requirements for ceremony and custom. For ethno-religious groups, resistance to interfaith marriage may be a form of self-segregation.

In an interfaith marriage, each partner typically adheres to their own religion. One issue which can arise in such unions is the choice of faith in which to raise the children.

Legal status

Human right
According to Article 16 of the Universal Declaration of Human Rights, men and women who have attained the age of majority have the right to marry "without any limitation due to race, nationality or religion". Although most of Article 16 is incorporated verbatim in Article 23 of the International Covenant on Civil and Political Rights, the references to religious and racial limitations is omitted. Article 17, clause two, of the American Convention on Human Rights says that all men and women have the right to marry, subject to the conditions of domestic law "insofar as such conditions do not affect the principle of nondiscrimination established in this Convention."

United States
According to the Pew Research Center Religious Landscape Study, interfaith marriage is increasingly common in the United States, accounting for 39% of marriages since 2010.

Joan Boocock Lee, an Episcopalian British American actress married to a Jewish husband, stated that in the mid-20th century United States, the couple faced difficulty adopting a child.

India

Interfaith marriage is controversial in some areas, especially disapproval of relationships between Hindus and Muslims (where in some cases non-Muslims are required to convert to complete the marriage) by conservative Muslims. Advertisements and films depicting Hindu-Muslim relationships have attracted condemnation and legal action. Hindu-Muslim couples have experienced harassment, including posting personal details on social media. In 2020 and 2021, several Indian states with BJP governments passed laws prohibiting forced conversions, and requiring notification of intent to marry and a waiting period, and allowing anyone to object to the union. Interfaith marriages have been taken as an inherent indication of a forced conversion, despite some individuals stating they will not be converting in order to marry. The laws have been used to arrest and in some cases torture Muslim men who have married Hindu women.  Fearing vigilante violence and after facing long delays and uncooperative lawyers and government officials, some couples have fled to other states to get married, often losing their jobs. In August 2021, the Gujarat High Court limited the scope of that state's law on the grounds of freedom of religion.

Saudi Arabia
Religion in Saudi Arabia is severely restricted, with the Wahhabi Islam as the state religion. Public celebration or advocacy of any other religion is generally prohibited. Atheism and blasphemy against Islam are punishable by death, but private celebration of other religions is allowed despite occasional harassment. All immigrants seeking Saudi citizenship must convert to Islam.

Israel

In Israel, marriages are performed by delegated religious authorities and people must marry people with the same religion. Interfaith marriages are not allowed domestically but interfaith marriages performed in other countries are recognized. Hitbolelut is a derogatory term used mainly to refer with prejudice to Jewish inter-faith couples, who can be criticised as being anti-Zionist or anti-Israeli, particularly when one partner is Muslim or is identified as being Palestinian or Arab.

By religion

Baháʼí Faith 
According to the Baháʼí Faith, all religions are inspired by God and interfaith marriage is permitted. A Baháʼí ceremony should be performed with the non-Baháʼí rite (or ceremony). If both ceremonies are performed, the non-Baháʼí ceremony should not invalidate the Baháʼí ceremony; the Baháʼí partner remains a Baháʼí, and is not adopting the religion of the other partner in the ceremony. The Baháʼí partner should also abstain from vows (or statements) committing them to a declaration of faith in another religion or that are contrary to the principles of the Baháʼí Faith. The two ceremonies should be performed on the same day; their order is not important. The Baháʼí ceremony may be performed in the place of worship of the other religion if it is afforded respect equal to the non-Baháʼí ceremony and is clearly distinct from the non-Baháʼí ceremony.

Christianity 

In Christianity, an interfaith marriage is a marriage between a Christian and a non-Christian (e.g. a wedding between a Christian man and a Jewish woman, or between a Christian woman and a Muslim man); it is to be distinguished between an interdenominational marriage in which two baptized Christians belonging to two different Christian denominations marry, e.g. a wedding between a Lutheran Christian and a Catholic Christian. The consensus of the early Church Fathers was that "interreligious marriage undermined the ecclesiological integrity of the Christian community" though as Christianity rapidly spread, cases would arise among non-Christian couples in which one person converted to Christianity; Apostolic Tradition, an early Christian Church Order, references an interfaith couple in its instructions on Christian prayer at the seven fixed prayer times and the ablutions preceding them, stating:

In early Christianity, the Church of the East, in the Council of Seleucia-Ctesiphon in AD 410, ruled that "Christian women should not marry across religious boundaries" though it allowed for Christian men to marry "women of all nations" (neshē men kul 'ammin) in order that Christian men would "instruct them in the ways of Christianity." The cultural context at the time was that a couple's children would follow the religion of the father.

In the Presbyterian Church (USA), the local church congregation is tasked with supporting and including the interfaith couple in the life of the Church, "help[ing] parents make and live by commitments about the spiritual nurture of their children", and being inclusive of the children of the interfaith couple. The pastor is to be available to help and counsel the interfaith couple in their life journey.

The Catholic Church recognizes as sacramental, (1) the marriages between two baptized Protestants or between two baptized Orthodox Christians, as well as (2) marriages between baptized non-Catholic Christians and Catholic Christians, although in the latter case, consent from the diocesan bishop must be obtained, with this termed "permission to enter into a mixed marriage". To illustrate (1), for example, "if two Lutherans marry in the Lutheran Church in the presence of a Lutheran minister, the Catholic Church recognizes this as a valid sacrament of marriage." On the other hand, although the Catholic Church recognizes marriages between two non-Christians or those between a Catholic Christian and a non-Christian, these are not considered to be sacramental, and in the latter case, the Catholic Christian must seek permission from his/her bishop for the marriage to occur; this permission is known as "dispensation from disparity of cult".

In Methodist Christianity, the 2014 Book of Discipline of the Allegheny Wesleyan Methodist Connection discourages interfaith marriages, stating "Many Christians have married unconverted persons. This has produced bad effects; they have either been hindered for life, or have turned back to perdition." Though the United Methodist Church authorizes its clergy to preside at interfaith marriages, it notes that  has been interpreted "as at least an ideal if not an absolute ban on such [interfaith] marriages as an issue of scriptural faithfulness, if not as an issue of Christian survival." At the same time, for those already in an interfaith marriage (including cases in which there is a non-Christian couple and one party converts to Christianity after marriage), the Church notes that Saint Paul "addresses persons married to unbelievers and encourages them to stay married (see )."  The Wesleyan Holiness Association of Churches teaches that "For a Christian to marry an unbeliever is unscriptural. If one does marry an unconverted party and trouble follows, he/she cannot blame God for his/her wrongdoing but must expect to pay the penalty, for the marriage covenant is morally binding so long as both live and, therefore, may not be dissolved at will."

Hinduism 

In Hinduism, spiritual texts like Vedas do not have any views on interfaith marriages by differentiating between people of different religions. This is because there was no known religion in old times when Vedas were written. Law books like Manusmriti, Yajnavalkya Smriti, and Parashara speak of marriage rules among various kulas and gotras i.e. marriage outside of varna. Manusmriti versions are numerous as the original is not preserved but it represents one of the oldest attempts to formally regulate the secular society of India. It is not a religious text. According to the varna system, marriage is normally between two individuals of the same varna but marrying outside of your varna is also feasible. Ancient Hindu literature identified four varnas: Brahmins, Kshatriyas, Vaishyas and Shudras. In ancient India.

Islam 

Interfaith marriages are recognized between Muslims and non-Muslim People of the Book (usually enumerated as Jews, Christians, and Sabians). Historically, in Islamic culture and traditional Islamic law Muslim women have been forbidden from marrying Christian or Jewish men, whereas Muslim men have been permitted to marry Christian or Jewish women. It is lawful for Muslim men to marry Jewish or Christian women but not a polytheist woman (Quran 5:5). In the case of a Muslim-Christian marriage, which is to be contracted only after permission from the Christian party, the Christian spouse is not to be prevented from attending church for prayer and worship, according to the Ashtiname of Muhammad, a treaty between Muslims and Christians recorded between Muhammad and Saint Catherine's Monastery.

On the other hand, according to the traditional understanding of interfaith marriage in Islam, Muslim women are forbidden from intermarrying with Non-Muslim men based on Islamic law. The Quran states:

In some societies outside the traditional dar al-islam, interfaith marriages between Muslims and Non-Muslims are not uncommon, including marriages that contradict the historic Sunni understanding of ijmāʿ (the consensus of fuqāha) as to the bounds of legitimacy. The tradition of reformist and progressive Islam, however, permits marriage between Muslim women and Non-Muslim men; Islamic scholars opining this view include Khaleel Mohammed, Daayiee Abdullah, and Hassan Al-Turabi, among others. Early Muslim jurists in the most-prominent schools of Islamic jurisprudence ruled in fiqh that the marriage of a Muslim man to a Christian or Jewish woman is makruh (disapproved) if they live in a non-Muslim country. ʿUmar ibn al-Khaṭṭāb (634–644) denied interfaith marriage to Muslim men during his command of the ummah.

Many Arab countries allow interfaith marriages to Christian or Jewish women but not to Christian or Jewish men. In Lebanon for example, there is no civil personal status law. Conventionally, marriages are performed according to the sect the spouses belong to.Turkey allows marriages between Muslim women and Non-Muslim men through secular laws. In Tunisia since 16 September 2017, Muslim women can lawfully marry any man of any faith, or of none. In Malaysia, a Non-Muslim must convert to Islam in order to marry a Muslim and the offspring of such unions are automatically Muslims.

Canadian Islamic scholar Ahmad Kutty has expressed disapproval of all interfaith marriages, citing Umar. According to Canadian Islamic teacher Bilal Philips, the verse permitting Muslim men to marry Non-Muslim women is no longer valid for several reasons (including its misinterpretation). Canadian Islamic scholar Shabir Ally has also said that it is makruh for a Muslim man to marry outside his religion. The movement of progressive Islam permits marriage between Muslim women and Non-Muslim men; Members opining this view include Muslim scholars Khaleel Mohammed, Daayiee Abdullah, and Hassan Al-Turabi, among others.

Judaism 

Interfaith marriage in Judaism was historically viewed with disfavor by Jewish leaders, and it remains controversial. The Talmud and poskim prohibit non-Jews to marry Jews, and discuss when the prohibition is from the Torah and when it is rabbinical. In 1236, Moses of Coucy encouraged Jewish men who had married Christian or Muslim women to divorce them. In 1844, the reform Rabbinical Conference of Brunswick permitted Jews to marry "any adherent of a monotheistic religion" if children of the marriage were raised Jewish. This conference was controversial; one of its resolutions called on members to abolish the Kol Nidre prayer, which opens the Yom Kippur service. One member of the conference later changed his opinion, becoming an opponent of intermarriage.

Traditional Judaism does not consider marriage between a Jew by birth and a convert as intermarriage; Biblical passages which apparently support intermarriage, such as that of Joseph to Asenath and Ruth to Boaz, were regarded by classical rabbis as having occurred after the non-Jewish spouse had converted. Some still considered Canaanites forbidden to marry even after conversion, although this did not necessarily apply to their children.

Orthodox Judaism refuses to accept intermarriage and tries to avoid facilitating them.
Conservative Judaism does not sanction intermarriage but encourages acceptance of the non-Jewish spouse by the family in the hope that such acceptance will lead to the spouse's conversion to Judaism. In December 2014 the United Synagogue of Conservative Judaism's United Synagogue Youth controversially modified a binding rule that its leaders would not date non-Jews, replacing it with a "recogni[tion of] the importance of dating within the Jewish community."

Reform and Reconstructionist Judaism do not generally regard the authority of classical rabbis; many rabbis from these denominations are willing to officiate at interfaith marriages, although some try to persuade intermarried couples to raise their children as Jews. In 1870, some Reform Jews published the opinion that intermarriage is prohibited.

In 2015 the Reconstructionist Rabbinical College voted to accept rabbinical students in interfaith relationships, making Reconstructionist Judaism the first major movement within Judaism to allow rabbis to have relationships with non-Jewish partners. Humanistic Judaism is a nontheistic alternative in contemporary Jewish life, defining Judaism as the cultural and historical experience of the Jewish people. The Society for Humanistic Judaism answers the question, "Is intermarriage contributing to the demise of Judaism?" on its website: "Intermarriage is the positive consequence of a free and open society. If the Jewish community is open, welcoming, embracing, and pluralistic, we will encourage more people to identify with the Jewish people rather than fewer. Intermarriage could contribute to the continuity of the Jewish people."

During the early 19th century, intermarriage was relatively rare; less than one-tenth of one percent of the Jews of Algeria, for example, practiced exogamy. Since the early 20th century, rates of Jewish intermarriage have increased. In the United States from 1996 to 2001, nearly half (47 percent) of marriages involving Jews were intermarriages with non-Jewish partners (a similar proportion—44 percent—as in the early 20th century in New South Wales).

In Israel, the religious authorities, which are the only entities authorized to perform weddings in Israel, are prohibited from marrying couples unless both partners share the same religion. Therefore, interfaith couples can be legally married in Israel only if one of the partners converts to the religion of the other. Interfaith couples from Israel and Lebanon often travel to Cyprus to wed.

Serer religion 
In orthodox Serer religion (an ethnoreligious faith), interfaith and interracial marriages are forbidden. Banishment and disinheritance may be levied against a Serer who disobeys the law. The Serer-Noon (a sub-group of the Serer people) adhere strongly to this teaching.

Sikhism 
Despite some gurdwaras allowing weddings between a Sikh and a non-Sikh, the vast majority oppose it. As per the 1945 Sikh Rehat Maryada (Code of Conduct), an interfaith anand karaj is not allowed within the Sikh faith. The 10th Sikh Guru had indicated within The 52 Hukams of Guru Gobind Singh that "a Sikh’s daughter must be married to a Sikh". In 2014, the Sikh Council in the UK developed a consistent approach towards marriages in Gurdwaras where one partner is not of Sikh origin, following a two-year consultation with Gurdwara Sahib Committees, Sikh Organisations, and individuals. The resulting guidelines were approved by the General Assembly of Sikh Council UK on 11 October 2014, and state that Gurdwaras are encouraged to ensure that both parties to an Anand Karaj wedding are Sikhs, but that where a couple chooses to undertake a civil marriage they should be offered the opportunity to hold an Ardas, Sukhmani Sahib Path, Akhand Path, or other service to celebrate their marriage in the presence of family and friends. Some gurdwaras permit mixed marriages, which has led to controversy.

Zoroastrianism 
Some traditional Zoroastrians in India disapprove of and discourage interfaith marriages, and female adherents who marry outside the faith are often considered to be excommunicated. When a female adherent marries a partner from another religion, they go through the risk of not being able to enter the Agyaris and Atash Behrams. In the past, their partner and children were forbidden from entering Zoroastrian religious buildings; this is often still observed. A loophole was found to avoid such expulsion: the offspring (especially born out of wedlock) of a Parsi man and a non-Parsi woman were often "adopted" by the Parsi father and tacitly accepted into the religion. Alternatively in a few cases such as that of Suzanne RD Tata, the non-Zoroastrian spouse has been allowed to convert Zoroastrianism by undergoing the navjote ritual  Interfaith marriages may skew Zoroastrian demographics, since the number of adherents is low.

According to Indian law (where most Parsis live), only the father of the child must be a Zoroastrian for the child (or children) to be accepted into the faith. This has been debated, since the religion promotes gender equality (which the law violates). Zoroastrians in North America and Europe defy the rule, and children of a non-Zoroastrian father are accepted as Zoroastrians.

Sacred music 
In modern times various composers have written sacred music for use during interfaith marriage ceremonies including:
 John Serry Sr.

See also

 Auto-segregation
 Ecumenism
 Endogamy
 Flirty Fishing
 Interracial marriage
 Love jihad
 Bahu Lao, Beti Bachao
 interdenominational marriage

References

Further reading
 Interfaith Marriage: Share and Respect with Equality, Dr. Dilip Amin, Mount Meru publishing
 This is My Friend, This is My Beloved: A Pastoral Letter on Human Sexuality (Jewish) Elliot N. Dorff, The Rabbinical Assembly
 It All Begins with a Date: Jewish Concerns about Intermarriage: Jewish Concerns about Intermarriage, Alan Silverstein, Jason Aronson, 1995, 
 Leadership Council of Conservative Judaism, Statement on Intermarriage. Adopted on March 7, 1995
 'Why Marry Jewish: Surprising Reasons for Jews to Marry Jews', Doron Kornbluth, [Targum/Feldheim], 2003, 
 'Dear Rabbi, Why Can't I Marry Her?', Eliezer Shemtov, [Targum/Feldheim], 2006, 
 Strange Wives: Intermarriage in the biblical world, Stanley Ned Rosenbaum and Allen Secher, 2014, ISBN 0986322601
Intimate Diversity: an Anglican Practical Theology of Interreligious Marriage, Paul Aidan Smith, [Brill], 2021, ISSN 2452-2953, ISBN 979-90-04-46031-7
Being Both: Embracing Two Religions in One Interfaith Family, Susan Katz Miller, 2013, ISBN 9780807013199

External links

Catholic Encyclopedia: Mixed Marriage
Jewish Encyclopedia: Intermarriage
More on the Jewish view on Intermarriage
The Marriage Imbroglio
Resources for Interfaith Families where one partner is Jewish from Interfaithfamily.com
 

 
Marriage